The Tale is a 2018 American drama film written and directed by Jennifer Fox and starring Laura Dern, Ellen Burstyn, Jason Ritter, Elizabeth Debicki, Isabelle Nélisse, Common, Frances Conroy, and John Heard. It tells the story about Fox's own childhood sexual abuse and her coming to terms with it in her later life. It premiered at the 2018 Sundance Film Festival and aired on HBO on May 26, 2018.

Plot
Jennifer Fox is an acclaimed documentary filmmaker and professor in her 40s when her mother, Nettie, calls her in alarm after discovering an essay she wrote when she was 13. The essay is about a "relationship" Jennifer had when she was 13 and which she dismisses as something she hid from her mother at the time to not upset her, because her boyfriend was "older".

After re-reading the essay Jennifer begins to do research on that period in her life. She imagines herself as being older and sophisticated but is surprised at how small and childlike she appears in photos from that time. Jennifer's relationship began one summer when she went to an intensive horse training camp with three other girls. She lived with the beautiful and enigmatic Mrs. G, who also had Jenny and the girls run with professional coach Bill Allens, who was in his 40s. After the summer ends Mrs. G and Bill reveal to Jenny they are lovers.

After the camp, Jenny kept her horse with Mrs. G and continued to see her and Bill on the weekends. Eventually Jenny began spending time with Bill alone. He began sexually grooming her, until finally raping her, telling her that they were "making love".

When Jennifer's partner finds letters written to her by Bill, he says that she was raped, but she refuses to see it that way, proclaiming that she is not a victim. However she slowly begins to question whether her recollections are accurate and eventually realizes despite her protests she had been exhibiting symptoms of being sexually abused for years. She goes to visit Mrs. G, who refuses to acknowledge her role in Jenny's abuse and asks her to leave.

As Jennifer continues to investigate that summer, she realizes that Bill and Mrs. G were probably grooming other girls. She remembers a college student named Iris Rose who worked for Mrs. G. Jennifer tracks Iris Rose down who tells her that she, Mrs. G and Bill had threesomes and that Mrs. G was actively involved in finding girls for Bill. This prompts Jennifer to remember that she was supposed to participate in group sex with Mrs. G, Bill and Iris one weekend. Jenny, who threw up each time she was raped by Bill, had an anxiety attack and threw up the day before she was due to go away for the weekend, causing her mother to keep her at home. Realizing she no longer wanted to be in a relationship with Bill, Jenny called him and broke up with him, even as he pleaded with her to stay. Unlike Bill, Mrs. G coldly accepted Jenny's decision to remove her horse that weekend. Jenny wrote about her time with Bill in an essay for school (calling it a work of fiction) in which she proclaimed herself a hero, not a victim; this is the essay her mother finds at the beginning of the film.

Jennifer goes to an awards ceremony where Bill is being honored to confront him, calling him out as a child molester in front of his wife and the other attendees. Bill denies everything and leaves. Jennifer has a panic attack and goes to the bathroom, and imagines sitting with her 13-year-old self.

Cast 
 Laura Dern as Jennifer "Jenny" Fox
 Isabelle Nélisse as Jenny, age 13
 Jessica Sarah Flaum as Jenny, age 15
 Elizabeth Debicki as Jane "Mrs. G" Gramercy, Jennifer's riding instructor
 Frances Conroy as older Mrs. G
 Jason Ritter as William P. "Bill" Allens, Jennifer's running coach and Mrs. G's lover. In 2023, Fox named Ted Nash as the true identity of this character.
 John Heard as older Bill
 Ellen Burstyn as Nadine "Nettie" Fox, Jennifer's mother
 Laura Allen as Young Nettie
 Common as Martin, Jennifer's boyfriend
 Jodi Long as Becky
 Shay Lee Abeson as Young Becky
 Tina Parker as Franny
 Isabella Amara as Young Franny

Production 
On May 5, 2015, it was reported that Laura Dern, Ellen Burstyn, Elizabeth Debicki, and Sebastian Koch would star in The Tale, written and directed by Jennifer Fox. It was set to begin principal photography that summer. On May 14, 2016, it was reported that the film was being shopped to foreign buyers at the Cannes Film Festival, and Common, Jason Ritter, Frances Conroy, and John Heard were announced as also being part of the cast. Filming began in Louisiana on October 20, 2015, and wrapped in December.

Release
In January 2018, HBO Films acquired distribution rights to the film. It premiered on HBO on May 26, 2018.

Reception

Critical response
The Tale was met with critical acclaim. The website's critical consensus reads, "The Tale handles its extraordinarily challenging subject matter with sensitivity, grace, and the power of some standout performances led by a remarkable Laura Dern." On Metacritic, the film has a weighted average score of 90 out of 100, based on 26 critics, indicating "universal acclaim".

Accolades

References

External links 
 
 
 
 

American drama films
HBO Films films
Films about child sexual abuse
2018 drama films
2010s English-language films
2010s American films
2018 independent films